The Hinchman-Lippincott House is located at 1089 North Park Avenue in Haddon Heights of Camden County, New Jersey, United States. The house was built  and added to the National Register of Historic Places on February 17, 1995, for its significance in architecture and exploration/settlement. It is part of the Haddon Heights Pre-Revolutionary Houses Multiple Property Submission (MPS).

History
The Hinchmann-Lippincott house is associated with the earliest founders of Haddon Heights, New Jersey. The first permanent settlement in the Haddon Heights area was established by various families from Flushing, New York. John Hinchmann purchased a 1000-acre plot from John Hugg in 1699.

In the early 1700s John Hinchmann built two farmhouses on the property: the Hinchmann-Lippincott House and the Col. Joseph Ellis House.

The Hinchmann family owned the property until it was divided and sold by Isaac Hinchmann in 1762. The Hinchmann-Lippincott House and 100 acres was bought by David Hurley. In 1807, James Hurley sold the property, including the house, to Nathaniel Lippincott. Benjamin Lippincott, who built the first railroad station in Haddon Heights, was also the last Lippincott to live in the house. In the early twentieth century, he subdivided the land for housing.

See also
National Register of Historic Places listings in Camden County, New Jersey
Col. Joseph Ellis House

References

Houses on the National Register of Historic Places in New Jersey
Georgian architecture in New Jersey
Houses completed in 1699
Houses in Camden County, New Jersey
National Register of Historic Places in Camden County, New Jersey
Haddon Heights, New Jersey
New Jersey Register of Historic Places
1699 establishments in New Jersey
Colonial architecture in New Jersey